Fatma is a 2021 Turkish crime drama streaming television series directed by Özer Feyzioğlu and Özgür Önürme and starring Burcu Biricik, Uğur Yücel, Mehmet Yılmaz Ak, and Hazal Türesan. The show was released on Netflix on 27 April 2021, consisting of one season for a total of 6 episodes. It was set and filmed in Istanbul, Turkey, and tells the story of a cleaning lady who gets involved in a dangerous path involving criminals and outlaws to find her husband.

Plot
Working as a cleaner, Fatma's life takes a completely different turn with the sudden disappearance of her husband Zafer, who was released from prison recently. In her attempt to find her husband, Fatma finds herself unexpectedly committing a murder. Her husband's connections to criminals and outlaws poses a great danger to Fatma's life. In order to survive, Fatma has no choice but to continue to eliminate her enemies. As she continues to kill in disguise using her appearance as a cleaning lady, Fatma turns this situation into a ritual of taking revenge for what she has experienced in her life.

Cast

Main 
 Burcu Biricik - Fatma Yılmaz
 Uğur Yücel - Yazar
 Mehmet Yılmaz Ak - Bayram
 Hazal Türesan - Emine/Mine
 Olgun Toker - Sidar
 Gülçin Kültür Şahin - Kadriye
 Deniz Hamzaoğlu - İsmail
 Çağdaş Onur Öztürk - Yusuf

Episodes

Reception
Shortly after release the series was praised by critics for its plot

References

External links
 
 

2020s Turkish television series
2021 Turkish television series debuts
2021 Turkish television series endings
Turkish drama television series
Turkish-language Netflix original programming
Television shows set in Istanbul
Television series produced in Istanbul